The United League was an association football league that existed in England from 1896 to 1902 and again from 1905 to 1909.

The league was created in 1896 to provide clubs which played in other leagues in southern or central England with an additional midweek game.  Over several years, various clubs joined or left the league but by 1899, departures left the league struggling, culminating in the cessation of the league in 1902.

Champions
Source:
1896–97 - Millwall Athletic
1897–98 - Luton Town
1898–99 - Millwall Athletic
1899–1900 - Wellingborough
1900–01 - Rothwell Town Swifts
1901–02 - Irthlingborough
Not contested between 1902 and 1905
1905–06 - Watford
1906–07 - Crystal Palace
1907–08 - Brentford
1908–09 - New Brompton

1896–1897 table

1897–1898 table

References

Association football leagues in Europe
Football in England
Defunct football leagues in England